Dectobrycon armeniacus is a species of characin endemic to Peru.  It is the only member of its genus.

References
 

Characidae
Monotypic fish genera
Endemic fauna of Peru
Fish of Peru
Fish described in 2006